The  is a dam on the Ōi River in Aoi-ku, Shizuoka, Shizuoka Prefecture on the island of Honshū, Japan. It was the first concrete gravity dam to be constructed on the Ōi River, and has a hydroelectric power generating station owned by the Tokyo Electric Power Company.

History
The potential of the Ōi River valley for hydroelectric power development was realized by the Meiji government at the start of the 20th century. The Ōi River was characterized by a high volume of flow and a fast current. Its mountainous upper reaches and tributaries were areas of steep valleys and abundant rainfall, and were sparsely populated.

The British interests were bought out by 1921, and the company was renamed , for its plan to divert water from the Ōi River to the Hayakawa River in Yamanashi Prefecture through a system of penstocks, and thus generate electricity. Work on the Tashiro Dam began in 1924 and was completed in 1928.

After the breakup of Nippon Hassoden at the end of World War II into various regional power utilities, the bulk of the dams on the Ōi River came under the control of Chubu Electric Power. However, only the Tashiro Dam was given to Tokyo Electric Power due to its previous owner, Tokyo Dento.

Design
The Tashiro Dam was designed as a solid core, non-overflow concrete gravity dam. Two hydroelectric power plants along this route produce 17,400 KW and 22,700 KW of power respectively.

Surroundings
Tashiro Dam is located in the very northern tip of Shizuoka Prefecture, surrounded on three sides by the high peaks of the Minami Alps National Park, an area of high mountains, forests, and a popular vacation area. The dam is on a route for mountain climbers on the way to the Japanese Alps, and can be reached on foot. However, the dam itself and its associated electrical power plant are not open to the public, and access to the area by car is prohibited.

References
Japan Commission on Large Dams. Dams in Japan:Past, Present and Future. CRC Press (2009). 
photo page with data
damnet photo page with data

Gravity dams
Dams in Shizuoka Prefecture
Hydroelectric power stations in Japan
Dams completed in 1928
1928 establishments in Japan